Rubén Forestello is an Argentine football manager. He is currently the manager of Nueva Chicago in the Primera B Nacional.

References

1971 births
Living people
Argentine football managers
San Martín de San Juan managers
Club Atlético Patronato managers